Marching in Time is the fifth studio album by American heavy metal band Tremonti. It was released on September 24, 2021, via Napalm Records. The record was produced by Michael "Elvis" Baskette, who produced Tremonti's past four records. The title track was released on August 3, 2021. The riff of "Now and Forever" was elected by Guitar Worlds readers as the best of 2021.

Track listing

Personnel 
Tremonti
 Mark Tremonti – lead guitar, lead vocals, arrangement
 Eric Friedman – rhythm guitar, backing vocals, arrangement, strings, keyboards, programming
 Ryan Bennett – drums
 Tanner Keegan - bass, backing vocals

Production
 Michael "Elvis" Baskette – production
 Josh Saldate – assistant engineering
 Jef Moll – engineer, digital editing
 Jeremy Frost – guitar technician
 Daniel Tremonti – creative direction
 Brad Blackwood – mastering

Charts

References

2021 albums
Mark Tremonti albums
Napalm Records albums
Albums produced by Michael Baskette